Junonia oenone, the blue pansy or dark blue pansy, is a Nymphalid butterfly native to Africa. "Blue pansy" is also used in India to describe Junonia orithya.

Subspecies
 Junonia oenone oenone from continental Africa.
 Junonia oenone epiclelia Boisduval, 1833 from Madagascar, Aldabra, Astove, Assumption and Cosmoledo Island.

Description
The wingspan is 40–52 mm. The upper surface of the forewings is black with white markings towards the apex. The upper surface of the hindwings is black with white markings on the outer edge, and a characteristic large metallic-blue spot. This blue spot is smaller and more a dull purple in females. The underside of the forewings is brown with white markings corresponding to those on the upper surface. The under surface of the hindwings is almost uniform brown.

Larval food plants
The larvae feed on Adhatoda densiflora, Mackaya bella, Justicia natalensis and Asystasia (A. gangetica), Isoglossa, Pualowilhelmia and Ruella species.

References

 Junonia oenone, UK Butterflies

oenone
Butterflies of Africa
Butterflies of Asia
Butterflies described in 1758
Taxa named by Carl Linnaeus